Pseudopostega serrata is a moth of the family Opostegidae. It is widespread
in Costa Rica up to elevations of 1,520 meters. It has also been recorded from Ecuador and southern Panama.

The length of the forewings is 2.3–3.4 mm. Adults are mostly white. Adults are on wing through much of the year in Costa Rica, with known records from January, March, April, May and from July to September. There is one record for January in Ecuador and March in Panama.

Etymology
The species name is derived from the Latin serratus (toothed like a saw) in reference to the minutely serrated caudal margin of the male gnathos.

External links
A Revision of the New World Plant-Mining Moths of the Family Opostegidae (Lepidoptera: Nepticuloidea)

Opostegidae
Moths described in 2007